Troyetsky is a rural locality (a khutor) in Panfilovskoye Rural Settlement, Novoanninsky District, Volgograd Oblast, Russia. The population was 221 as of 2010. There are 7 streets.

Geography 
Troyetsky is located in forest steppe on the Khopyorsko-Buzulukskaya Plain, 31 km southeast of Novoanninsky (the district's administrative centre) by road. Trud-Rassvet is the nearest rural locality.

References 

Rural localities in Novoanninsky District